Petar Dichev (born 16 June 1969) is a Bulgarian alpine skier. He competed at the 1992, 1994 and the 1998 Winter Olympics.

References

1969 births
Living people
Bulgarian male alpine skiers
Olympic alpine skiers of Bulgaria
Alpine skiers at the 1992 Winter Olympics
Alpine skiers at the 1994 Winter Olympics
Alpine skiers at the 1998 Winter Olympics
People from Smolyan